Shelburne Hotel may refer to:

Shelburne Hotel (Atlantic City, New Jersey), listed on the NRHP in New Jersey
Shelburne Hotel (Seaview, Washington), listed on the NRHP in Washington